San Lorenzo (Spanish for "St. Lawrence") is a census-designated place (CDP) located in the East Bay of the San Francisco Bay Area in Alameda County, California, United States. The population was 29,581 at the 2020 census. It is an unincorporated community, located at the banks of San Lorenzo Creek. It was originally named Squattersville in 1851, but later renamed to San Lorenzo.

In 1944, under contract to the U.S. Navy, The David D. Bohannon Company began construction of San Lorenzo Village, which was one of the nation's first planned communities, with parcels designated for schools, churches, parks, and several retail centers. Bohannon's pioneering pre-cutting techniques, referred to as the "California method," were used in later developments, such as the more famous Levittown, Pennsylvania.

History 

San Lorenzo is located on the route of El Camino Viejo on land of the former Rancho San Lorenzo, a Mexican land grant given to Guillermo Castro in 1841, and the former Rancho San Leandro, granted to José Joaquin Estudillo in 1842.

Early residents during the California Gold Rush era lived here as squatters along the border between Rancho San Lorenzo and Rancho San Leandro. The informal name given to the area was Squatterville.

The first post office opened in San Lorenzo in 1854.

Many of the early inhabitants are buried in San Lorenzo Pioneer Cemetery, including Moses Wicks, who brought oysters to San Leandro Bay from Patchogue, Long Island. The cemetery is maintained by the county and the Hayward Area Historical Society.

San Lorenzo was mostly farmland, a significant center of production of fruit and flowers, from the mid-19th century to the mid-20th century.

In 1944, under contract to the U.S. Navy, The David D. Bohannon Company began construction of San Lorenzo Village, a tract of two- and three-bedroom homes for workers in the East Bay's war industries. San Lorenzo Village was one of the nation's first planned communities, with parcels designated for schools, churches, parks, and several retail centers. Bohannon's pioneering pre-cutting techniques, referred to as the "California method," were used in later developments, such as the more famous Levittown, Pennsylvania. Home construction continued into the 1950s to accommodate the region's booming population.

San Lorenzo Village housing project launched as the largest privately financed housing project on the West Coast during WWII.  San Lorenzo Shopping Center became one of the country's first planned community shopping centers and was home to the first Mervyn's Department Store.

Segregation 
The original San Lorenzo Village homes were restricted to white owners, and re-sale of homes were limited to white owners through racially restrictive covenants on property deeds. "Sales brochures in the early to mid-1950s [...] assured prospective buyers that the village was "a safe investment" because "farsighted protective restrictions ... permanently safeguard your investment.""  These restrictions, among others around fencing and house colors, were enforced by the San Lorenzo Village Association.

Legal enforcement of such covenants was deemed to violate the Equal Protection Clause of the Fourteenth Amendment by the Supreme Court in Shelley v. Kraemer (1948), meaning that while parties could chose to abide by the covenants, they could no longer be legally used to prevent non-white persons from buying properties with such restrictions. As a general note, without specific reference to San Lorenzo, after Shelley, homeowners associations still would bar non-white owners by requiring membership in the association before buying property, and federal and state governments refused to enforce the Shelley decision. In San Lorenzo, the black population remained under one-half percent in the early 1970s.

The language of these restrictions, even if not enforceable, may still be on property deeds.

Geography

San Lorenzo Creek runs partly through the town. It is located between the incorporated cities of San Leandro to the north and Hayward to the south.

Demographics

2010
The 2010 United States Census reported that 23,452 people, 7,425 households, and 5,792 families resided in the CDP. The racial makeup of the CDP was 47.4% White (32.4% non-Hispanic), 4.8% African American (4.5% non-Hispanic), 1.0% Native American, 21.6% Asian, 0.8% Pacific Islander, 17.9% from other races, and 6.5% from two or more races. 37.7% of the population was Hispanic or Latino of any race.

The Census reported that 99.7% of the population lived in households and 0.3% lived in non-institutionalized group quarters.

There were 7,425 households, out of which 40.0% had children under the age of 18 living in them, 56.7% were opposite-sex married couples living together, 14.7% had a female householder with no husband present, and 6.6% had a male householder with no wife present. 5.1% of households were unmarried opposite-sex partnerships and 0.7% were same-sex married couples or partnerships. 17.3% of households were made up of individuals, and 9.1% had someone living alone who was 65 years of age or older. The average household size was 3.15 and the average family size was 3.54.

The population was spread out, with 24.2% under the age of 18, 9.4% aged 18 to 24, 26.9% aged 25 to 44, 26.8% aged 45 to 64, and 12.7% who were 65 years of age or older. The median age was 37.9 years. For every 100 females, there were 95.3 males. For every 100 females age 18 and over, there were 91.9 males.

There were 7,674 housing units, of which 7,425 were occupied, of which 75.0% were owner-occupied and 25.0% were occupied by renters. The homeowner vacancy rate was 1.1%; the rental vacancy rate was 4.1%. 73.0% of the population lived in owner-occupied housing units and 26.7% lived in rental housing units.

2000
As of the 2000 United States Census, there were 21,898 people, 7,500 households, and 5,677 families residing in the CDP.

There were 7,500 households, out of which 34.7% had children under the age of 18 living with them, 58.1% were married couples living together, 12.6% had a female householder with no husband present, and 24.3% were non-families. 19.1% of all households were made up of individuals, and 11.5% had someone living alone who was 65 years of age or older. The average household size was 2.92 and the average family size was 3.34.

In the CDP, the population was spread out, with 25.2% under the age of 18, 8.0% from 18 to 24, 29.5% from 25 to 44, 21.3% from 45 to 64, and 16.0% who were 65 years of age or older. The median age was 38 years. For every 100 females, there were 94.0 males. For every 100 females age 18 and over, there were 91.3 males.

The median income for a household in the CDP was $66,170, and the median income for a family was $71,787. Males had a median income of $53,626 versus $39,531 for females. The per capita income for the CDP was $21,922. About 3.7% of families and 5.4% of the population were below the poverty line, including 6.4% of those under age 18 and 4.2% of those age 65 or over.

Government 
San Lorenzo is an unincorporated community and thus is governed directly by the County of Alameda. The area is policed by the Alameda County Sheriff's Office.  The San Lorenzo Village Homes Association, home to 5767 single-family homes, has been in place since 1945.  The Homes Association Board is made up of five volunteer homeowners.  The San Lorenzo Village Homes Association is the master association to four sub homeowners associations.

Public education
San Lorenzo is served by the San Lorenzo Unified School District, established in 1865.

References

External links

 San Lorenzo Library
 San Lorenzo Express (local news)
 San Lorenzo Village Homes Association
 Friends of San Lorenzo Creek
 San Lorenzo Area History
 Hayward Area Historical society

Populated places established in 1944
Census-designated places in Alameda County, California
Census-designated places in California
Unincorporated communities in Alameda County, California
Unincorporated communities in California
1944 establishments in California